Weakness or asthenia is a symptom of a number of different conditions.

Weakness may also refer to:

 Muscle weakness, the inability to exert force with one's muscles
 The Weakness, the thirty-seventh book in the Animorphs series
 "Weakness", a song by Opeth from Damnation
 "Weakness", a song by The Wanted from The Wanted

See also

 
 
 Weak (disambiguation)
Akrasia, also known as "weakness of will"
Drawback (disambiguation)
Facial weakness
Fatigue (medical)
Somnolence
Strength (disambiguation)
Strengths and weaknesses (disambiguation)
Vulnerability